The 2010 F4 Eurocup 1.6 was the eighteenth season of the series for 1600cc Formula Renault machinery, and the only season run under the guise of F4 Eurocup 1.6. The series began on 17 April at Motorland Aragon and ended on 10 October at Circuit de Catalunya, after seven rounds and fourteen races.

Stoffel Vandoorne clinched the championship with a meeting to spare, winning six races en route to a 36-point championship winning margin over Norman Nato, with Mathieu Jaminet edging out Paul-Loup Chatin for third place overall. Franck Matelli finished fifth; the only other driver to win a race over the season.

It was the final season run under the "F4 Eurocup 1.6" name, as the series was renamed the "French F4 Championship" for 2011.

Driver lineup

Race calendar and results
 Under its new name, the F4 Eurocup 1.6 series was part of the World Series by Renault and shared seven race weekends with the main three World Series events.

Championship standings
 Points were awarded to the top ten drivers in both races on a 15-12-10-8-6-5-4-3-2-1 basis. Additional points were awarded to the driver achieving pole position and fastest lap in each race. Only a driver's best twelve results counted towards the championship.

References

External links
 The official website of the F4 Eurocup 1.6 

F4 Eurocup 1.6
F4 Eurocup 1.6
Eurocup F4